Lorenzo Germani (born 3 March 2002) is an Italian road cyclist, who currently rides for UCI WorldTeam . On 3 August 2022  announced they had signed Germani to their UCI WorldTeam for the 2023 season alongside six other riders on their development team.

Major results
2020
 2nd Road race, National Junior Road Championships
2021
 2nd Overall Tour du Pays de Montbéliard
2022
 1st  Road race, National Under-23 Road Championships
 1st Stage 2 Giro della Valle d'Aosta
 4th Flèche Ardennaise
 7th Giro del Belvedere

References

External links

2002 births
Living people
Italian male cyclists
21st-century Italian people